Point Pleasant is a borough in Ocean County, New Jersey, United States. As of the 2010 United States Census, the borough's population was  down from 19,306 in 2000 but still up from 18,177 in 1990.

The Borough is a Jersey Shore community situated south of the Manasquan River and north and east of the Beaverdam Creek and its confluence with the Metedeconk River.

Point Pleasant was incorporated as a borough by an act of the New Jersey Legislature on April 21, 1920, from portions of Brick Township, based on the results of a referendum held on May 19, 1920. The borough was reincorporated on March 12, 1928. Point Pleasant is distinct from Point Pleasant Beach, which is a separate community. The borough gets its name from Point Pleasant Beach, which gets its name from its location at the northern end of the Barnegat Peninsula, a long, narrow barrier peninsula that divides the Barnegat Bay from the Atlantic Ocean at the Manasquan Inlet.

History 
Around 1500, the area that included the future Point Pleasant was the ceremonial meeting place of the Lenape Native Americans, who called it the "Land of Tall Timber". In approximately 1665, the first European settlers arrived in the area, mainly fishermen, farmers and boat builders.

On February 15, 1850, Governor Daniel Haines and the New Jersey Legislature separated Ocean County from Monmouth County, and created Brick Township, including the Point Pleasant area, which became independent of Brick Township in 1920, though the post office carried the designation "West Point Pleasant" until 1956. According to the town's official website, many longtime residents still use that name. The town's first mayor was Melville B. Parker, chosen after J.H. Harvey declined the position after being elected. The town was initially a logging town, although logging was never a significant part of the local economy.

In 1925, the Manasquan River-Bay Head Canal was completed as part of the inland waterway. The canal, which divides Point Pleasant in half, provides a passage for boats, and is the northernmost leg of the Intracoastal Waterway which traverses the East Coast of the United States along the Atlantic Ocean between New Jersey and Florida. In 1964, Senator Clifford P. Case introduced legislation that changed the canal's name to the Point Pleasant Canal. The two lift bridges over the canal, at Route 88 and Bridge Avenue, can be opened as many as 300 times per day during the summer to allow boats to pass underneath as marine traffic has the right of way.

Though often regarded as a summer resort, the borough's website emphasizes that it is a "year round community of approximately 19,000 residents".

Geography 
According to the United States Census Bureau, the borough had a total area of 4.17 square miles (10.79 km2), including 3.49 square miles (9.04 km2) of land and 0.67 square miles (1.75 km2) of water (16.16%).

The borough is bounded on the north by the Manasquan River, on the east by Point Pleasant Beach and Bay Head, on the south by Beaver Dam Creek and on the west by Brick Township; the borough also borders Mantoloking in Ocean County and Brielle in Monmouth County.

Demographics

Census 2010 

The Census Bureau's 2006–2010 American Community Survey showed that (in 2010 inflation-adjusted dollars) median household income was $78,521 (with a margin of error of ± $3,209) and the median family income was $94,399 (± $4,750). Males had a median income of $67,632 (± $4,111) versus $47,428 (± $5,097) for females. The per capita income for the borough was $36,596 (± $1,783). About 1.8% of families and 3.6% of the population were below the poverty line, including 2.5% of those under age 18 and 6.6% of those age 65 or over.

Census 2000 
As of the 2000 United States Census there were 19,306 people, 7,560 households, and 5,231 families residing in the borough. The racial makeup of the borough was 85.83% White, 5.33% African-American, Hispanic or Latino of any race were 10.41%, 0.14% Native American, 0.54% Asian, 0.01% Pacific Islander, 0.50% from other races, and 0.69% from two or more races.

There were 7,560 households, out of which 32.1% had children under the age of 18 living with them, 54.8% were married couples living together, 10.9% had a female householder with no spouse, and 30.8% were non-families. 25.7% of all households were made up of individuals, and 10.5% had someone living alone who was 65 years of age or older. The average household size was 2.52 and the average family size was 3.06.

In the borough the population was spread out, with 23.7% under the age of 18, 6.0% from 18 to 24, 30.5% from 25 to 44, 24.8% from 45 to 64, and 14.9% who were 65 years of age or older. The median age was 39 years. For every 100 females, there were 92.5 males. For every 100 females age 18 and over, there were 89.6 males.

The median income for a household in the borough was $55,987, and the median income for a family was $64,798. Males had a median income of $50,828 versus $32,886 for females. The per capita income for the borough was $25,715. About 2.0% of families and 3.2% of the population were below the poverty line, including 3.0% of those under age 18 and 5.2% of those age 65 or over.

Government

Local government 
Point Pleasant is governed under the Borough form of New Jersey municipal government, which is used in 218 municipalities (of the 564) statewide, making it the most common form of government in New Jersey. The governing body is comprised of the Mayor and the six-member Borough Council, with all positions elected at-large on a partisan basis as part of the November general election. A Mayor is elected directly by the voters to a four-year term of office. The Borough Council is comprised of six members elected to serve three-year terms on a staggered basis, with two seats coming up for election each year in a three-year cycle. The Borough form of government used by Point Pleasant is a "weak mayor / strong council" government in which council members act as the legislative body with the mayor presiding at meetings and voting only in the event of a tie. The mayor can veto ordinances subject to an override by a two-thirds majority vote of the council. The mayor makes committee and liaison assignments for council members, and most appointments are made by the mayor with the advice and consent of the council.

The Mayor is the head of municipal government; sees that state laws and borough ordinances are faithfully executed; presides over the council. votes only to break ties; can veto ordinances subject to override by ⅔ majority of Council; and appoints subordinate officers with Council approval. After thirty days or upon Council disapproval, Council fills posts. The Borough Council is the legislative body of municipality. The Council overrides a mayor's veto by ⅔ majority of all members, confirms mayor's appointments. The Council gains appointment power upon failure to confirm mayor's appointee or after office vacant for thirty days. The council has all executive responsibility not placed in office of mayor.

, the Mayor of Point Pleasant is Republican Robert A. Sabosik, whose term of office ends December 31, 2022. The members of the Borough Council are Borough President Charlene Archer (R, 2022), William T. Borowsky (R, 2024), Valerie Coulson (R, 2023), Antoinette "Toni" DePaola (R, 2024), Joseph Furmato Jr. (R, 2022) and John R. Wisniewski (R, 2023). 

In the November 2022 election, Mayor Robert A. Sabosik defeated independent challenger William "Bill" Borowsky, securing another four-year mayoral term. Sabosik received 63.34% of votes, while Borowsky received 36.40% of votes. Republican incumbents Joseph Furmato Jr. and Charlene Archer will each serve another three-year term after running unopposed for Borough Council.

In February 2015, the Borough Council selected Michael Thulen Jr., from a list of three candidates recommended by the Republican municipal committee to fill the seat expiring in December 2016 that had been held by Robert A. Sabosik vacant until he was sworn in as mayor the previous month. In the November 2015 general election, Thulen was elected to serve the one year remaining on the term of office.

Federal, state, and county representation 
Point Pleasant is in the 4th Congressional District and is part of New Jersey's 30th state legislative district. 

Prior to the 2011 reapportionment following the 2010 Census, Point Pleasant had been in the 10th state legislative district. Prior to the 2010 Census, all of Point Pleasant had been part of the 4th Congressional District, a change made by the New Jersey Redistricting Commission that took effect in January 2013, based on the results of the November 2012 general elections. As part of the 2010 redistricting, 1,802 residents in a wedge-shaped section in the western part of the borough were placed in the 3rd District, while the remaining 16,590 were placed in the 4th District.

 

Ocean County is governed by a Board of County Commissioners comprised of five members who are elected on an at-large basis in partisan elections and serving staggered three-year terms of office, with either one or two seats coming up for election each year as part of the November general election. At an annual reorganization held in the beginning of January, the board chooses a Director and a Deputy Director from among its members. , Ocean County's Commissioners (with party affiliation, term-end year and residence) are:

Commissioner Director John P. Kelly (R, 2022, Eagleswood Township),
Commissioner Deputy Director Virginia E. Haines (R, 2022, Toms River),
Barbara Jo Crea (R, 2024, Little Egg Harbor Township)
Gary Quinn (R, 2024, Lacey Township) and
Joseph H. Vicari (R, 2023, Toms River). Constitutional officers elected on a countywide basis are 
County Clerk Scott M. Colabella (R, 2025, Barnegat Light),
Sheriff Michael G. Mastronardy (R, 2022; Toms River) and
Surrogate Jeffrey Moran (R, 2023, Beachwood).

Politics 
As of March 23, 2011, there were a total of 12,681 registered voters in Point Pleasant, of which 2,336 (18.4%) were registered as Democrats, 4,026 (31.7%) were registered as Republicans and 6,311 (49.8%) were registered as Unaffiliated. There were 8 voters registered as Libertarians or Greens. Among the borough's 2010 Census population, 68.9% (vs. 63.2% in Ocean County) were registered to vote, including 88.5% of those ages 18 and over (vs. 82.6% countywide).

In the 2012 presidential election, Republican Mitt Romney received 56.7% of the vote (5,141 cast), ahead of Democrat Barack Obama with 42.4% (3,843 votes), and other candidates with 1.0% (89 votes), among the 9,161 ballots cast by the borough's 13,245 registered voters (88 ballots were spoiled), for a turnout of 69.2%. In the 2008 presidential election, Republican John McCain received 56.5% of the vote (5,599 cast), ahead of Democrat Barack Obama with 41.4% (4,103 votes) and other candidates with 1.4% (138 votes), among the 9,904 ballots cast by the borough's 13,154 registered voters, for a turnout of 75.3%. In the 2004 presidential election, Republican George W. Bush received 60.5% of the vote (5,857 ballots cast), outpolling Democrat John Kerry with 38.2% (3,700 votes) and other candidates with 0.7% (85 votes), among the 9,683 ballots cast by the borough's 12,795 registered voters, for a turnout percentage of 75.7.

In the 2013 gubernatorial election, Republican Chris Christie received 71.6% of the vote (4,352 cast), ahead of Democrat Barbara Buono with 26.6% (1,619 votes), and other candidates with 1.7% (105 votes), among the 6,179 ballots cast by the borough's 13,118 registered voters (103 ballots were spoiled), for a turnout of 47.1%. In the 2009 gubernatorial election, Republican Chris Christie received 64.4% of the vote (4,606 ballots cast), ahead of Democrat Jon Corzine with 27.6% (1,977 votes), Independent Chris Daggett with 5.9% (421 votes) and other candidates with 1.0% (69 votes), among the 7,152 ballots cast by the borough's 12,905 registered voters, yielding a 55.4% turnout.

Education 
The Point Pleasant School District serves students in pre-kindergarten through twelfth grade. As of the 2019–20 school year, the district, comprised of four schools, had an enrollment of 2,842 students and 236.2 classroom teachers (on an FTE basis), for a student–teacher ratio of 12.0:1. Schools in the district (with 2019–20 enrollment data from the National Center for Education Statistics) are 
Nellie F. Bennett Elementary School with 764 students in grades Pre-K–5, 
Ocean Road School with 502 students in K–5, 
Memorial Middle School with 675 students in 6–8 and 
Point Pleasant Borough High School with 871 students in grades 9–12

Saint Peter School, founded in 1923, serves students in grades K–8 and operates under the supervision of the Roman Catholic Diocese of Trenton. In 2016, the school was one of ten schools in New Jersey, and one of four private schools in the state, recognized as a National Blue Ribbon School by the United States Department of Education, a recognition celebrating excellence in academics.

Infrastructure

Transportation

Roads and highways 

Route 88 traverses the borough to its eastern terminus at Route 35, just across the border with Point Pleasant Beach.

Public transportation 
NJ Transit provides bus service to Philadelphia on the 317 route.

Ocean Ride local service is provided on the OC3A Brick—Point Pleasant and the OC4 Lakewood—Brick Link routes.

Health care
Point Pleasant Hospital was founded in 1918 and became part of Ocean Medical Center in 1982. The hospital closed permanently in 2001.

In media 
 A fictionalized version of the town was the setting of a short-lived 2005 television show, Point Pleasant.
 On The Tonight Show Starring Jimmy Fallon, there is a recurring spoof set in the borough called "Point Pleasant Police Department", in which the host and a guest (Alec Baldwin, Bill Hader, Jake Gyllenhaal and Kevin James) play local police officers who repeatedly spit food on each other.<ref>Staff. "Alec Baldwin and Jimmy Fallon: Point Pleasant Police Department", Dan's Papers', October 22, 2013. Accessed July 15, 2014.</ref>

 Notable people 

People who were born in, residents of, or otherwise closely associated with Point Pleasant include: ((B) denotes that the person was born there)

 Antonella Barba (born 1986), contestant on the sixth season of American Idol Rachel Bolan (born 1966), bass guitar player and main songwriter of the metal band, Skid Row
 Agnes Boulton (1893–1968), pulp fiction writer who married Eugene O'Neill, living in her home there after their marriage
 Peter Cancro, CEO of Jersey Mike's Subs, who started working at the chain's Point Pleasant location as a 14-year-old
 Caroline Casagrande (born 1976), member of the New Jersey General Assembly representing the 11th District, who was the youngest assemblywoman ever when she was elected in 2008
 Nancy Chard (1933–2010), politician who served in the Vermont House of Representatives and in the Vermont Senate(B)
 Andrew R. Ciesla (born 1953), politician who served in the New Jersey Senate from 1992 to 2012, where he represented the 10th Legislative District(B)
 Fred J. Cook (1911–2003), investigative journalist and author(B)
 Dick Cooke (born 1956), head coach of the Davidson Wildcats baseball team since 1991 who spent three years pitching in the minor leagues for the Boston Red Sox
 Chris Cummiskey (born 1964), former member of both the Arizona State Senate and the Arizona House of Representatives(B)
 Tawny Cypress (born 1976), actress who appeared on K-Ville'' as Ginger "Love Tap" LeBeau
 Arnold D'Ambrosa (born 1933), politician who served in the New Jersey General Assembly from 1974 to 1976, until is career was cut short by a political scandal
 Michael J. Doherty (born 1963), Surrogate of Warren County, New Jersey who served in the New Jersey Senate from 2009 to 2022
 Kirsten Dunst (born 1982), actress(B)
 Marlene Lynch Ford (born 1954), politician, prosecutor and jurist who served in the New Jersey General Assembly
 Jeff Frazier (born 1982), professional outfielder who played in Major League Baseball for the Detroit Tigers in 2010
 Todd Frazier (born 1986), retired major league baseball player
 Virginia E. Haines (born 1946), politician who serves on the Ocean County Board of chosen freeholders and had served in the New Jersey General Assembly from 1992 to 1994 and as executive director of the New Jersey Lottery from 1994 to 2002
 Frankie Hayes (1914–1955), catcher who played for 14 seasons in Major League Baseball who holds the record for most consecutive games played by a catcher
 Laurel Hester (1956–2006), police officer who rose to national attention with her deathbed appeal for the extension of pension benefits to her domestic partner
 Jacqui Kapinowski (born 1962), Paralympian who competed in wheelchair curling at the 2010 Winter Paralympics and in rowing at the 2016 Summer Paralympics
 Leonard Lomell (1919–2011), United States Army Ranger who played a pivotal role in destroying German gun emplacements on D-Day
 Ryan Malleck (born 1993), American football tight end for the Houston Texans of the National Football League
 "Irish" Teddy Mann (born 1951), former professional boxer(B)
 A. Dale "Bud" Mayo, business executive who is the founder of Digital Cinema Destinations Corp
 James M. Murray, 26th Director of the United States Secret Service, serving in that position since May 2019(B)
 Eugene O'Neill (1888–1953), playwright
 Oona O'Neill (1925–1991), daughter of Eugene O'Neill and writer Agnes Boulton, and the fourth and last wife of comic and filmmaker Charlie Chaplin
 Diamond Dallas Page (born 1956), former professional wrestler(B)
 Christie Pearce (born 1975; formerly Christie Rampone), USA Soccer player
 Kurt Pellegrino (born 1979), MMA fighter who competes under the UFC brand
 Soraya (1969–2006), Grammy Award-winning, musician(B)
 Michael John Trotta (born 1978), composer and conductor
 Arthur Augustus Zimmerman (1869–1936), cycling sprint rider who won the first world championship in 1893

See also

References

External links 

 Point Pleasant website
 Point Pleasant School District
 
 School Data for the Point Pleasant School District, National Center for Education Statistics
 Point Pleasant Borough Branch of Ocean County Library
 Point Pleasant Historical Society
 Point Pleasant New Jersey
 Visiting Point Pleasant
 Pleasant Chamber of Commerce – Point Pleasant Locally

 
1920 establishments in New Jersey
Borough form of New Jersey government
Boroughs in Ocean County, New Jersey
Logging communities in the United States
Populated places established in 1920